The 2016 WNBA season for the Washington Mystics of the Women's National Basketball Association was scheduled to begin May 14, 2016.

Transactions

WNBA Draft

Trades

Roster

Season standings

Schedule

Preseason

Regular season

Playoffs

Awards and honors

References

External links
The Official Site of the Washington Mystics

Washington Mystics seasons
Washington
Washington Mystics